Kochaj albo rzuć (Love or leave) is a 1977 Polish comedy film directed by Sylwester Chęciński. It is the third and final part of a trilogy about two quarreling peasants Kargul and Pawlak, which started with Sami swoi ( All Friends Here or Our Folks; literally "only our own") (1967) and was followed by Nie ma mocnych (a Polish idiom meaning "no one can do") (1974).

Plot 
Kazimierz Pawlak and Władysław Kargul, two elderly peasants from Polish conservative countryside, and their granddaughter Ania  receive an invitation to visit the United States of America from Kazimierz' brother John. They begin their travels on the ship TSS Stefan Batory, and end it on a United Airline Flight to the O'Hare airport in Chicago. After arriving in Chicago, it is revealed that John died a few days earlier, leaving behind not only his fortune but also an illegitimate daughter. The newly found family member makes Kargul and Pawlak change their prejudices and view of America.

Cast 
 Władysław Hańcza - Wladyslaw Kargul
 Wacław Kowalski - Kazimierz Pawlak
 Duchyll Martin Smith - Shirley Gladys Wright
 Bob Lewandowski - September
 Stanley Roginski - Uplander
 Joseph Slowik - Tuner
 Anna Dymna - Ania Pawlak
  - The Passenger
  - Mania Pawlak
 Halina Buyno-Łoza - Aniela Kargul
 Kazimiera Utrata - Guest
 Andrzej Wasilewicz - Zenek Adamiec
 Jan Pietrzak - Chicago radio host

References

External links 

1977 comedy films
1977 films
Polish comedy films
Films set in Chicago
Films set in Illinois
Films shot in Chicago
Films shot in Illinois
Foreign films set in the United States